An election to Essex County Council took place on 6 May 1993 as part of the 1993 United Kingdom local elections. 98 councillors were elected from various electoral divisions, which returned either one or two county councillors each by first-past-the-post voting for a four-year term of office.

Summary

Previous composition

1989 election

Composition of council seats before election

Results

|-bgcolor=#F6F6F6
| colspan=2 style="text-align: right; margin-right: 1em" | Total
| style="text-align: right;" | 98
| colspan=5 |
| style="text-align: right;" | 416,116
| style="text-align: right;" | 
|-
|}

Results by Electoral Divisions

Basildon

District Summary

Division Results

 
 

 

 
 

 

 
 

 

 
 

 

 
 

 

 
 

 

 
 

 

Note: George Dighton was elected as a Conservative in 1989, but here attempted to defend his seat as an Independent

Braintree

District Summary

Division Results

Brentwood

District Summary

Division Results

Castle Point

District Summary

Division Results

Chelmsford

District Summary

Division Results

Colchester

District Summary

Division Results

No Independent candidate as previous (-1.2).

No Liberal candidate as previous (-6.5).

No SDP candidate as previous (−36.0).

Epping Forest

District Summary

Division Results

Harlow

District Summary

Division Results

Maldon

District Summary

Division Results

Rochford

District Summary

Division Results

Southend

District Summary

Division Results

Tendring

District Summary

Division Results

Thurrock

District Summary

Division Results

Uttlesford

District Summary

Division Results

References

Essex County Council elections
1993 English local elections
1990s in Essex